University Mall is the largest mall in western Alabama.  It is located at the intersection of McFarland Boulevard and Veterans' Memorial Parkway in Tuscaloosa, the busiest in the city. The anchor stores are JCPenney and 2 Belk stores. There is 1 vacant anchor store that was once Sears.

Owned and managed by the Montgomery-based Aronov Realty, the mall opened on August 20, 1980. Anchor stores of the  enclosed mall include JCPenney, the vacant Sears, Belk Women, and Belk Men, Home & Kids. The only outlier property on mall premises is a branch of Regions Bank.

The property where University Mall now stands was previously home to the ruins of World War II-era Northington Naval Hospital and associated support buildings. These ruins were finally destroyed during the filming of the climactic scene of the 1978 Burt Reynolds film Hooper. The ruins of the hospital had lain derelict for many years and included a few dozen buildings as well as two immensely tall brick smoke-stacks. A few of the old barracks buildings remained until 2000; they housed the Tuscaloosa City Board of Education offices until they were relocated to the old Tuscaloosa High School (later Tuscaloosa Middle School) building on Queen City Avenue.

On April 27, 2011, the mall was narrowly missed by a powerful tornado that ripped through Tuscaloosa and killed dozens of people, sustaining moderate damage.

On November 2, 2017, it was announced that Sears would be closing as part of a plan to close 63 stores nationwide. The store closed in January 2018.

References

External links
 University Mall website

Buildings and structures in Tuscaloosa, Alabama
Shopping malls in Alabama
Shopping malls established in 1980
Tourist attractions in Tuscaloosa, Alabama
1980 establishments in Alabama